Darko Puškarić (born 13 July 1985) is a Serbian professional footballer who plays as a defender for Čukarički.

Career
Puškarić started his senior career at Novi Sad in the Second League of Serbia and Montenegro. He also spent some time on loan with Serbian League Vojvodina side Šajkaš Kovilj during the 2003–04 and 2004–05 seasons.

In the summer of 2009, Puškarić moved to newly promoted Serbian SuperLiga club Spartak Subotica. He switched to Vojvodina in the 2014 winter transfer window, helping them win the Serbian Cup later that year. In the summer of 2017, Puškarić signed with Čukarički.

Honours
Vojvodina
 Serbian Cup: 2013–14

External links
 
 
 
 
 

Association football defenders
FK Čukarički players
FK Spartak Subotica players
FK Vojvodina players
RFK Novi Sad 1921 players
Serbian First League players
Serbian footballers
Serbian SuperLiga players
Footballers from Novi Sad
1985 births
Living people